Regina—Lumsden—Lake Centre (formerly known as Regina—Arm River) was a federal electoral district in Saskatchewan, Canada, that was represented in the House of Commons of Canada from 1997 to 2015.

Geography
The district included the northwestern part of the city of Regina and extended outward from Regina to Nokomis in the north, Davidson in the northwest and Tugaske in the west.

History
The electoral district was created as "Regina—Arm River" in 1996 from Regina—Lumsden and portions of Moose Jaw—Lake Centre, Mackenzie and Regina—Qu'Appelle ridings.

In 1997, its name was changed to "Regina—Lumsden—Lake Centre".

The riding was dissolved in the 2012 Canadian federal electoral redistribution, redistributed between Regina—Lewvan, Regina—Qu'Appelle, and Moose Jaw—Lake Centre—Lanigan.

Members of Parliament

Election results

See also
 List of Canadian federal electoral districts
 Past Canadian electoral districts

References

 
 
 Expenditures - 2008
 Expenditures - 2004
 Expenditures - 2000
 Expenditures - 1997
 Map of Regina—Lumsden—Lake Centre archived by Elections Canada

Notes

Politics of Regina, Saskatchewan
Former federal electoral districts of Saskatchewan